The 2007–08 Golden State Warriors season was their 62nd season in the NBA and their 35th in Oakland. The Warriors had the fifth best team offensive rating in the NBA.

Key dates prior to the start of the season:
 On June 28, the 2007 NBA draft took place in New York City.
 From July 1 to July 10, the free agency period took place.
 On October 9, the Warriors' pre-season started with a game against the Los Angeles Lakers in Honolulu, Hawaii.
 On October 30, the Warriors' season started with a home loss against the Utah Jazz.

Despite finishing the season with a 48-34 record, six more wins than the previous season, the Warriors failed to qualify for the playoffs, as all eight seed teams in the Western conference finished with a 50+ winning record. The Warriors has the second highest winning percentage (.585) of any team who failed to make the playoffs behind the 1971–72 Phoenix Suns. This had fans severely criticizing the conference system in the league as the Warriors had a better record than all eastern conference playoff teams up to the third seed. Teams such as the Atlanta Hawks had sub or .500 winning percentages but still managed to make the postseason.

Draft

Roster

Standings

Record vs. opponents

Game log
 Green background indicates win.
 Red background indicates regulation loss.

October
Record: 0–1; Home: 0–1; Road: 0–0

November
Record: 8–6; Home: 3–3 ; Road: 5–3

December
Record: 11–6; Home: 5–2; Road: 6–4

January
Record: 9–6; Home: 5–2; Road: 4–4

February
Record: 7–3; Home: 7–2; Road: 0–1

March
Record: 10–6; Home: 5–2; Road: 5–4

April 
Record: 3–6; Home: 2–2; Road: 1–4

Player stats

Regular season

Transactions

Trades

Free agency

Re-signed

Additions

Subtractions

Awards

References

Golden State Warriors seasons
Golden State Warriors
Golden State Warriors
Golden State Warriors